WKFC (101.9 FM) is a radio station licensed to North Corbin, Kentucky, United States. The station is owned by Radioactive, LLC.

History
The station went on the air as WPNS on September 29, 2006. On March 5, 2008, the station changed its call sign to the current WKFC.

References

External links

KFC
Radio stations established in 2008
2008 establishments in Kentucky